What Car? is a British monthly automobile magazine and website, currently edited by Steve Huntingford and published by Haymarket Consumer Media. Other team members include deputy editor Darren Moss and test editors Will Nightingale, Neil Winn, Lawrence Cheung, Dan Jones and Max Adams. The used car editors are Mark Pearson and Oliver Young. The consumer editor is Claire Evans. The editorial director is Jim Holder.

First published in November 1973, What Car? is intended primarily as a magazine for car buyers rather than dedicated enthusiasts. In addition to first drives and group tests of the latest models, it contains an extensive buyer's guide section to help consumers choose the right car for their needs and provides tips on how to get discounts on cars.

In 1978, the magazine held its first Car of the Year Awards, giving advice on the best models to buy, and this has since been an annual – and eagerly awaited – feature. In 1996, the website www.whatcar.com was launched. More recently, What Car? launched another print edition in 2006, published in India every two months, which subsequently became a monthly publication.

What Car? was featured in the 2018 movie Early Man, though under the name What Chariot?.

Car of the Year
Every year in January, What Car? hosts an awards ceremony, where it names the best cars in each sector of the car market, and an overall Car of the Year, with the Renault 20 receiving the inaugural award in 1978. In 1985, the Volkswagen Golf, in its second generation, became the first model to receive the award twice, having previously won it for the facelifted first generation car in 1981.

, Volkswagen is the most successful brand in the history of the awards, having taken the top prize a total of seven times. Members of the Volkswagen Group, such as Audi, SEAT and Škoda, have won it a further six times between them. Pure-electric cars have won the award three times.

As of 2023, the What Car? Car of the Year Awards awards are sponsored by MotorEasy.

True MPG
In April 2012, What Car? launched a new service called 'True MPG', which it claims gives consumers an idea of what they can really expect from a car if they drive it gently and stick to speed limits, but don't resort to any unrealistically slow acceleration or special hypermiling techniques. These True MPG figures are published alongside the official government fuel economy data, that car manufacturers are legally obliged to include in brochures.

What Car? Approved Used
In June 2012, What Car? launched an online car buying service called 'What Car Approved Used', which it claimed provides "peace of mind" to car buyers, by endorsing the "10 Points of Difference" promoted by the National Franchised Dealers Association.

The agreement came to a close in July 2015, and What Car? began to carry listings from other sources, dropping the 'Approved Used' branding.

New Car Buyer Marketplace
In October 2016, What Car? launched a new online car buying service called 'New Car Buyer Marketplace'. Built into the existing whatcar.com website, it lets readers buy discounted cars from dealers in their area who have signed up to a What Car? code of conduct.

Users can add options, change trim and alter finance preferences to get a ‘live' price which dealers are committed to. What Car?s 'Target Price' – a long-established recommendation of the most the magazine's mystery shoppers think someone should pay for a particular model – is displayed alongside the dealer price so users can check whether a deal represents good value.

References

External links
 

Automobile magazines published in the United Kingdom
Monthly magazines published in the United Kingdom
Magazines established in 1973
Magazines published in London